The Rat Race is a  science fiction novel by American writer Jay Franklin.  It was first published in book form in 1950 by Fantasy Publishing Company, Inc. in an edition of 1,500 copies of which 1,200 were hardcover.  The novel originally appeared in the magazine Collier's Weekly in 1947.

Plot summary
The novel concerns Lieutenant Commander Frank Jacklin who is blown up in a thorium bomb explosion while on the battleship Alaska.  He awakens in the body of Winnie Tompkins who had perpetrated the explosion.  As Tompkins, he learns of a plot by German agents to poison Franklin D. Roosevelt and he tries to warn the authorities.  He continues to become involved in intrigue until another accident restores Tompkins to his body, leaving Jacklin in the body of a dog.

Sources

External links
 
 

1950 American novels
1950 science fiction novels
American science fiction novels
Novels by Jay Franklin
Fiction about body swapping
Fantasy Publishing Company, Inc. books